Petrina is a feminine given name.

List of people with the given name 
 Petrina Fung (born 1954), Malaysian-born Chinese actress in Hong Kong
 Petrina Haingura (born 1959), Namibian politician
 Petrina Holdsworth (born 1952), British barrister and politician
 Petrina Price (born 1984), Australian high jumper

See also 
 Petrina (disambiguation)
 Petrina (surname)

Feminine given names
English feminine given names